Lateef Crowder dos Santos (born November 23, 1977) is a Brazilian-American actor, martial artist, and stuntman. As a member of the ZeroGravity stunt team since 2000, he has been featured in multiple internet short videos and demo reels, such as Inmate 451. An experienced capoeira practitioner, he started training in martial arts when he was 6 years old.

Biography
He was born in Salvador, Bahia, Brazil, but moved to San Jose, California, at the age of four. With great experience and training in Capoeira, taught by his father and gymnasts, he became an international competitor and became a member of the Zero Gravity Stunt Team. Today he is an inactive member. Lateef has since been working on his own acting career he appear in The protector 2005 movie stared with Tony jaa a Thai martial art actor and also known for working with Scott Adkins in undisputed 3 he played the character adriago Silva in the movie.

Career
dos Santos is best known for his appearance in Tom-Yum-Goong (known in North America as The Protector), using Capoeira in a fight scene with Tony Jaa. Due to an injury to his achilles tendon, the scene was cut short, but he has since recovered, and was featured in the martial arts feature, Duel of Legends, released in 2007.

Due to his Capoeira skills and gymnast with resemblance to the character, Lateef Crowder played the role of Eddy Gordo in the Tekken feature film. He has also featured in Undisputed 3 which stars Scott Adkins and Mykel Jenkins. Directed by Isaac Florentine and also stars in the Kevin Tancharoen directed short film Mortal Kombat: Rebirth. Another memorable work of Lateef was in Fight Science when he represented his style in tests to show the effectiveness of his kicks.

Since 2019, he appeared in the Disney+ original series The Mandalorian as the stunt double for Din Djarin / The Mandalorian, for which he won a Primetime Emmy Creative Arts Award for Outstanding Stunt Performance in 2022.

Filmography

References

External links

Video demo reel at WushuCentral.com
Biography at USA Gymnastics
Biography at ZeroGravity Stunts

1977 births
Living people
People from Salvador, Bahia
Afro-Brazilian male actors
American male film actors
American capoeira practitioners
American choreographers
Brazilian emigrants to the United States
African-American male actors
People from San Jose, California
21st-century American male actors
21st-century African-American people
20th-century African-American people
American people of Brazilian descent